The Essential is a compilation album by Canadian singer-songwriter Sarah McLachlan, released on 20 August 2013 by Legacy Recordings. It includes thirty-six songs, covering McLachlan's career from her debut album Touch (1988) through to 2010's Laws of Illusion. The Essential features the global hits like "Adia" and "Angel", and also tracks recorded especially for soundtracks, as well as covers.

The content 
The Essential includes songs from McLachlan's previous albums but also rare tracks recorded over the years. It features songs from Touch (1988) ("Vox", "Steaming", "Ben's Song"), Solace (1991) ("The Path of Thorns (Terms)", "Into the Fire"), Live (1992) ("Drawn to the Rhythm", "Back Door Man"), Fumbling Towards Ecstasy (1993) ("Possession", "Good Enough", "Elsewhere", "Fear"), The Freedom Sessions (1994) ("Ice Cream", "Hold On"), Surfacing (1997) ("Building a Mystery", "Sweet Surrender", "Adia", "Angel"), Afterglow (2003) ("Fallen", "Stupid", "World on Fire"), Afterglow Live (2004) ("Push", "Witness"), Wintersong (2006) ("River"), Closer: The Best of Sarah McLachlan (2008) ("Don't Give Up on Us", "U Want Me 2"), Laws of Illusion (2010) ("Loving You Is Easy", "Forgiveness", "Illusions of Bliss").

The Essential also contains rare tracks: "Dear God" (from the 1995 tribute album A Testimonial Dinner: The Songs of XTC), "I Will Remember You" (from the 1995 Brothers McMullen soundtrack), "Silence" (from Delerium's 1997 album Karma), "When She Loved Me" (from the 1999 Toy Story 2 soundtrack), "Blackbird" (from the 2001 I Am Sam soundtrack), "The Rainbow Connection" (from the 2002 charity album For the Kids), "Time After Time" (duet with Cyndi Lauper from Lauper's 2005 album The Body Acoustic), "Ordinary Miracle" (from the 2006 Charlotte's Web soundtrack). "Dear God" and "I Will Remember You" were later included on McLachlan's 1996 compilation Rarities, B-Sides and Other Stuff. The remix of "Silence" was later featured on McLachlan's 2001 compilation Remixed. "When She Loved Me", "Blackbird", "The Rainbow Connection", "Time After Time" and "Ordinary Miracle" were later included on McLachlan's 2008 compilation Rarities, B-Sides and Other Stuff Volume 2.

Track listing

Release history

References

2013 compilation albums
Sarah McLachlan compilation albums
Albums produced by Pierre Marchand
Albums produced by Greg Reely